Mariano Laurenti (15 April 1929 – 6 January 2022) was an Italian film director and actor.

Career
He started as a script supervisor and later became an assistant director for, among others, Mauro Bolognini and Stefano Vanzina. He directed 50 films between 1966 and 1999, being mainly active in the "commedia sexy all'italiana" genre. Laurenti died in Gubbio on 6 January 2022, at the age of 92.

Selected filmography

 Il vostro super agente Flit (1966)
 Zingara (1969)
 Satiricosissimo (1970)
 I due maghi del pallone (1970)
 Ubalda, All Naked and Warm (1972)
 Naughty Nun (1972)
 Il figlioccio del padrino (1973)
 Il vizio di famiglia (1975)
 L'affittacamere (1976)
 Classe mista (1976)
 The Schoolteacher Goes to Boys' High (1977)
 La compagna di banco (1977)
 Per amore di Poppea (1977)
 La liceale nella classe dei ripetenti (1978)
 How to Seduce Your Teacher (1979)
 L'infermiera di notte (1979)
 The Nurse in the Military Madhouse (1979)
 La ripetente fa l'occhietto al preside (1980)
 La settimana bianca (1980)
 Il ficcanaso (1981)
 L'onorevole con l'amante sotto il letto (1981)

References

External links

1929 births
2022 deaths
Film directors from Rome
Comedy film directors
Parody film directors
Italian parodists